Inamdar is an Indian surname derived from the feudal title Inamdar, which was held by feudal landholders. The surname is found primarily in the states of Maharashtra, Karnataka and Gujarat and occurs amongst Hindus, Muslims, and various castes. Major Inamdar families are from the district of Mumbai, Solapur, Olpad, Satara, Gadag, Belgaum, Ahmednagar, Bijapur, Pune, Kolhapur, Beed.

List of people with the name
Lakshmanrao Inamdar
Nagnath S. Inamdar
P. A. Inamdar
Shafi Inamdar
Maneesha S. Inamdar
Rucha Inamdar

See also
 Sardar
 Mankari
 Zamindar
 Jagirdar

References

Bibliography 
 
 

Titles of national or ethnic leadership
Indian words and phrases
Indian surnames